The 1995 Ohio State Buckeyes football team represented the Ohio State University in the 1995 NCAA Division I-A football season. The Buckeyes compiled an 11–2 record, including the 1996 Florida Citrus Bowl in Orlando, Florida, where they lost, 20–14, to the Tennessee Volunteers.

Schedule

Rankings

Roster

Game summaries

Boston College

Washington

Pitt

Notre Dame

Penn State

Wisconsin

Purdue

Iowa

Minnesota

Illinois

Indiana

Michigan

1996 Citrus Bowl

Coaching staff
 John Cooper – Head Coach – 8th year
 Bill Conley – Defensive Ends, Recruiting Coordinator – 9th
 Walt Harris – Quarterbacks – 1st
 Joe Hollis – Offensive Coordinator – 5th on staff (4th as OC)
 Mike Jacobs - Offensive Tackles, Tight Ends - 1st
 Fred Pagac – Linebackers – 16th
 Lovie Smith – Defensive Backs – 1st
 Tim Spencer – Running Backs – 2nd
 Chuck Stobart – Wide Receivers – 1st
 Bill Young – Defensive Coordinator – 8th

Depth chart

Q

Awards and honors
 Eddie George, Heisman Memorial Trophy
 Eddie George, Walter Camp Player of the Year Award
 Eddie George, Doak Walker Award
 Eddie George, Maxwell Award
 Terry Glenn, Fred Biletnikoff Award
 Orlando Pace, Vince Lombardi Award

1996 NFL draftees

References

Ohio State
Ohio State Buckeyes football seasons
Ohio State Buckeyes football